Josef Frank may refer to:

 Josef Frank (architect) (1885–1967), Austrian-born architect, artist, and designer
 Josef Frank (politician) (1909–1952), Czechoslovakian Communist politician

See also
Joseph Frank (disambiguation)